The James Millikin House is a historic house located at 125 N. Pine St. in Decatur, Illinois. The house was built in 1876 for James Millikin, a wealthy Decatur businessman who later founded Millikin University. The house has a towered Italianate design which has been called the "most imposing Victorian remnant" in Decatur. A mansard roof on the tallest tower provides a Second Empire influence to the design. The house's interior decorations include colored marble fireplaces, art glass windows, and a fresco above the main staircase.

The house was added to the National Register of Historic Places on December 3, 1974. Millikin University currently owns the house, which is open to the public as a museum.

References

External links
 James Millikin Homestead - official site

Houses on the National Register of Historic Places in Illinois
Italianate architecture in Illinois
Second Empire architecture in Illinois
Houses completed in 1876
Houses in Macon County, Illinois
Millikin University
Historic house museums in Illinois
Buildings and structures in Decatur, Illinois
Museums in Macon County, Illinois
University museums in Illinois
National Register of Historic Places in Macon County, Illinois